The Progress Report is a Canadian left-wing newsletter and podcast published by Progress Alberta and operated by Duncan Kinney.

Organisation 
The Progress Report is a newsletter and podcast written and hosted by Duncan Kinney. Its work includes investigative reporting. It self-describes itself as "proudly left wing" and of focussing its reporting on marginalised people and injustice.

Activities 
In 2021, via its Twitter channel, The Progress Report commented on how the Ukrainian Youth Unity Complex in Edmonton received Government of Canada funding for work reducing hate crimes, while also housing a statue of Nazi-collaborator Roman Shukhevych.

In 2021, The Progress Report stated that it had been refused access to the police's media relations team.

Critical reception 
The Progress Report has been praised for its focus on progressive issues, it has also been criticised for straying outside the traditional limits of journalism.

See also 

 Roman Shukhevych statue (Edmonton)

References

External links 

 The Progress Report Twitter
 Official website - The Progress Report

Canadian podcasts
News podcasts
Political podcasts
Magazines published in Alberta
Political magazines published in Canada